The 39 Melakhot (lamed-tet avot melakhah, "39 categories of work") are thirty-nine categories of activity which Jewish law identifies as prohibited by biblical law on Shabbat. Many of these activities are also prohibited on the Jewish holidays listed in the Torah, although there are significant exceptions that permit carrying and preparing food under specific circumstances on holidays (except Yom Kippur).

In addition to the 39 melakhot, certain other activities are forbidden on Shabbat due to rabbinic law.

There are often disagreements between Orthodox Jews and Conservative Jews or other non-Orthodox Jews as to the practical observance of Shabbat. It is of note that the (strict) observance of Shabbat is often seen as a benchmark for orthodoxy and indeed has legal bearing on the way a Jew is seen by an Orthodox religious court regarding their affiliation to Judaism.

The commandment
The commandment to keep Shabbat as a day of rest is repeated many times in the Tanakh, the Hebrew Bible. Its importance is also stressed in :

Meaning of "work"
Though melakha is usually translated as "work" in English, the term does not correspond to the ordinary definition of the term, as explained below.
The traditional analysis and explanation of the term, as well as the logic for identifying the activities prohibited to be done on the Sabbath, is recorded in the Talmudic Tractate of Shabbat (70a; 49b). 

The rabbis there noted the symmetry  between Genesis 2:1–3 and Exodus 31:1–11 and derive the rule on this basis (here applying the principle of "gezerah shavah"). 
The same term melakha ["work"] is used in both places:

 uses the term melakha in reference to the Creation:
Heaven and earth, and all their components, were completed. With the seventh day, God finished all the work [melakha] that He had done. He ceased on the seventh day from all the work [melakha] that he had been doing. God blessed the seventh day, and he declared it to be holy, for it was on this day that God ceased from all the work [melakha] that he had been creating to function.

 provides detailed instructions for the construction of the Tabernacle, again using the term melakha. The word is usually translated as "workmanship", which has a strong element of "creation" or "creativity". This section immediately precedes the section concerning "Sabbath-rest" quoted above. 

Really the term Melaka is best described as "externally creative activity". The sabbath is partly observed by refraining from externally creative activities. It is impossible to keep the sabbath in line with these 39 activities from just learning the 39 creative activities headings. Each one has its own specific rules and applications. The term headings are only a guide term for the law to be applied in specific situations.  

From the common wording (in the Hebrew original), and the juxtaposition of subject matter, the rabbis of the Mishnah derive a basis, as well as a listing, as to which activities are prohibited on the Sabbath day. 
In the first passage there is a "ceasing from" "creation" or "creating", thus melakha in the latter paragraph is also taken to refer to creative, and mindful, activity. As regards the listing: similarly, the activities required for the construction of the Mishkan (and preparing the shewbread) form the thirty-nine categories of activity listed below.

Definition
All the categories of work prohibited on the Sabbath are derived from activities which were required in the setting up, and maintenance of, the Tabernacle known as the "Mishkan". The first group of eleven activities are involved in the making of the Showbreads which were always present in the Mishkan. Or, according to another opinion, the exact same eleven activities were required for the procurement and manufacture of dyes required for the making of the tapestries that were used as part of the roofing of the Tabernacle. The next grouping was for the manufacture of the tapestries, starting with the manufacture of wool right from the shearing process. The next group were for the manufacture of the leather hides also used in the Tabernacle's covering starting right from the trapping of animals. The last group of activities are grouped together for things that were required in the construction, disassembly and running of the Tabernacle itself.

The thirty-nine melakhot are not so much activities as categories of activity. For example, "threshing" usually refers exclusively to the loosening of the edible part of grain attached to its chaff. From this heading the Talmudic legal discussion applies this to any separation of intermixed materials where a desirable inner portion is extracted from an undesirable exterior element. So, "threshing" was the heading of the topic that was used to describe this process as it was familiar to all in Talmudic times.

Many rabbinical scholars have, as above, pointed out that these regulations of labor have something in common – they prohibit any activity that is externally creative, or that exercises control or dominion over one's environment.

The extension of the definition is consistent with the common etymology -melakha for "work" and malach for messenger / agent  or "angel": just as the malach is the agent used to bring about the realization and execution of a certain idea, so does melakha take a thought or idea and carry through to turn it into a reality.

The definitions presented in this article are only 'headings' for in-depth topics and without study of the relevant laws it would be very difficult, perhaps impossible, to properly keep the Sabbath according to Halacha/Jewish Law.

The thirty-nine creative activities
The 39 melakhot are discussed in the Talmud in tractate Shabbat. As listed in the Mishna  (Shabbat 7:2), they are as follows:

Transferring between domains (see below) and preparing food are permitted on Jewish holidays. These are the only exceptions to the rule that activities prohibited on the Sabbath are likewise prohibited on holidays.

Note: The thirty-nine prohibited activities are bolded.

The Order of Bread

Planting
Hebrew:  (Zorea)

Definition: Promotion of plant growth.

Not only planting is included in this category; other activities that promote plant growth are also prohibited. This includes watering, fertilizing, planting seeds, or planting grown plants.

See further: Mishneh Torah Shabbat 8:2, 21:5; Shulchan Aruch Orach Chayim 336; Chayei Adam Shabbos 11

Plowing
Hebrew:  (Ḥoresh)

Definition: Promotion of substrate in readiness for plant growth, be it soil, water for hydroponics, etc.

Included in this prohibition is any preparation or improvement of land for agricultural use. This includes dragging chair legs in soft soil thereby unintentionally making furrows, or pouring water on arable land that is not saturated. Making a hole in the soil would also provide protection for a seed placed there from rain and runoff; even if no seed is ever placed there, the soil is now enhanced for the process of planting.

The Mishna (Shabbat 7:2) lists plowing after planting, although one must plow a field before planting. The Gemara asks why this order occurs and answers that the author of this Mishna was a Tanna living in the Land of Israel, where the ground is hard. Since the ground is so hard in Israel, it needed to be plowed both before planting and after planting. The Mishna lists plowing second, teaching that the second plowing (after planting) is [also] prohibited. (The plowing before the planting is also prohibited, if not biblically, certainly rabbinically). The Rambam lists plowing first, and planting second.

See further: Mishneh Torah Shabbat 7:3, 8:1, 21:2–4; Chayei Adam Shabbos 10

Reaping
Hebrew:  (Kotzer)

Definition: Severing a plant from its source of growth.

Removing all or part of a plant from its source of growth is reaping. Climbing a tree is rabbinically forbidden, for fear this may lead to one tearing off a branch. Riding an animal is also rabbinically forbidden, as one may unthinkingly detach a stick with which to hit the animal.

See further: Mishneh Torah Shabbat 8:3–5, 21:6–10; Chayei Adam Shabbos 12

Gathering
Hebrew:  (Me'amer)

Definition: Initial gathering of earth-borne/organic material in its original place.

E.g. After picking strawberries, forming a pile or collecting them into one's pockets, or a basket. Collecting rock salt or any mineral (from a mine or from the Earth) and making a pile of the produce. This can only occur in the place where the gathering should take place. So, a bowl of apples that falls in a house can be gathered as 1) they do not grow in that environment and 2) they were already initially gathered in the orchard.

However, subsequent gathering, which improves the object(s) affected is included in this law. For example, stringing diamonds together to form a necklace is a significant improvement of their gathered status. This may well extend to pearls as well.

See further: Mishneh Torah Shabbat 8:5, 21:11; Chayei Adam Shabbos 13

Threshing/extraction
Hebrew:  (Dosh)

Definition: Removal of an undesirable outer from a desirable inner.

This is a large topic of study. It refers to any productive extraction and includes juicing fruits and vegetables and wringing (desirable fluids) out of cloths, as the juice or water inside the fruit is considered 'desirable' for these purposes, while the pulp of the fruit would be the 'undesirable.' As such, squeezing (S'ḥita) to extract a desirable inner is generally forbidden unless certain rules are applicable dependant upon the case. The wringing of undesirable water out of cloths may also come under scouring/laundering. This activity should be viewed more accurately as extraction, while sorting (see below) is more akin to purification.

See further: Mishneh Torah Shabbat 8:7–10, 21:12–16; Shulkhan Arukh Orach Chayim 319–321; Chayei Adam Shabbos 14

Winnowing
Hebrew:  (Zoreh)

Definition: Sorting undesirable from desirable via the force of air (Babylonian Talmud), or dispersal via the force of air (Jerusalem Talmud).

In the Babylonian Talmud this refers exclusively to an act of separation, for example, chaff from grain – i.e. to any separation of intermixed materials. Example: If one has a handful of peanuts, in their paper-thin brown skins, and one blows on the mixture of peanuts and skins, dispersing the unwanted skins from the peanuts, this would be an act of winnowing according to both the Babylonian and Jerusalem Talmud.

The Jerusalem Talmud has a more inclusive and general definition of Zoreh. By this definition, use of the Venturi tube spray system and spray painting would come under this prohibition, while butane or propane propelled sprays (common in deodorants and air fresheners, etc.) are permissible to operate as the dispersal force generated is not from air, rather from the propellant within the can. According to the Babylonian Talmud's definition, neither of the above spraying methods is involved in sorting undesirable from desirable and therefore not part of this heading.

Rabbi Moses Isserles (the Rema) holds that, unusually, the Jerusalem Talmud's definition should also be taken into account. As there's no argument between the Rema and the Beit Yosef on this point, Ashkenazi and Sephardic Jews do not disagree with the Rema's extended inclusion of the Jerusalem Talmud's definition in this case.

See further: Shulkhan Arukh Orach Chayim 219:7; Chayei Adam Shabbos 15.

Sorting/purification
Hebrew:  (Borer)

Definition: Removal of undesirable from desirable from a mixture of types.

In the Talmudic sense usually refers exclusively to the separation of debris from grain – i.e. to any separation of intermixed materials which renders edible that which was inedible. Thus, picking small bones from fish in order to eat the meat would be borer. This prohibition has led to the popularity of gefilte fish as a culinary dish on the Sabbath, since it is deboned prior to being cooked or sold.

Sorting/purification differs from threshing/extraction as here there is a mixture of types, and sorting a mixture via the removal of undesirable elements leaves a purified, refined component. In contrast, threshing/extraction does not entail sorting or purification, just extraction of the inner from the unwanted housing or outer component, such as squeezing a grape for its juice. The juice and the pulp have not undergone sorting, the juice has been extracted from the pulp.

For example, suppose that one has a bowl of mixed raisins and peanuts, and desires to eat only the raisins. Removing (effectively sorting) the peanuts from the bowl, leaving a 'purified' pile of raisins free from unwanted peanuts, would be sorting/purification as the peanuts are removed. However, removing the desirable raisins from the peanuts does not purify the mixture, as one is left with undesirable peanuts (hence unrefined) not a refined component as before, and is thus permissible. Note that in this case there has not been any extraction of material from either the peanuts or raisins (threshing/extraction), just the sorting of undesirable from desirable (sorting/purification).

General Introduction:
After threshing, a mixed collection of waste matter remained on the threshing floor together with the grain kernels. Included in this combination would be small pebbles and similar debris.
These pebbles could not be separated by winnowing because they were too heavy to be carried by the wind. The pebbles and debris were therefore sorted and removed by hand. This process is sorting/purification.

Any form of selecting from (or sorting of) an assorted mixture or combination can be borer. This includes removing undesired objects, or matter from a mixture or combination.

Borer with mixed foods:
Even though the classic form of borer as performed in the Mishkan involved the removal of pebbles and similar waste matter from the grain produce, sorting/purification is by no means limited to the removal of "useless" matter from food. In fact, any selective removal from a mixture can, indeed, be sorting/purification, even if the mixture contains an assortment of foods. The criteria are types and desire, not intrinsic value. Therefore, removing any food or item from a mix of different types of foods simply because he does not desire the item at that time is considered sorting/purification.

The three conditions of sorting/purification:

Sorting/purification is permitted when three conditions are fulfilled simultaneously. It is absolutely imperative that all three conditions be present while sorting/purifying

 B'yad (By hand): The selection must be done by hand and not a utensil that aids in the selection.
 Oḥel Mitoḥ Psolet (Good from the bad): The desired objects must be selected from the undesired, and not the reverse.
 Miyad (Immediate use): The selection must be done immediately before the time of use and not for later use. There is no precise amount of time indicated by the concept of "immediate use" (miyad). The criteria used to define "immediate use" relate to the circumstances. For instance if a particular individual prepares food for a meal rather slowly, that individual may allow a more liberal amount of time in which to do so without having transgressed "borer."

Examples of Permissible and Prohibited Types of sorting/purification:

 Peeling fruits: Peeling fruits is permissible with the understanding that the fruit will be eaten right away.
 Sorting silverware: Sorting silverware is permitted when the sorter intends to eat the Sabbath meal immediately. Alternatively, if the sorter intends to set up the meal for a later point, it is prohibited.
 Removing items from a mixture: If the desired item is being removed from the mix then this is permissible. If the non-desired item is being removed, the person removing is committing a serious transgression according to the laws of the Sabbath.

See further: Mishneh Torah Shabbat 8:11–13, 21:17; Shulkhan Arukh Orach Chayim 319; Chayei Adam Shabbos 16

Grinding
Hebrew:  (Tochen)

Definition: Reducing an earth-borne thing's size for a productive purpose.

Dissection can arise in simply cutting into pieces fruits or vegetables for a salad. Very small pieces would involve dissection, therefore cutting into slightly larger than usual pieces would be permitted, thus avoiding cutting the pieces into their final, most usable, state.

All laws relating to the use of medicine on the Sabbath are a toldah, or sub-category, of this order, as most medicines require pulverization at some point and thus are dissected. The laws of medicine use on the Sabbath are complex; they are based around the kind of illness the patient is suffering from and the type of medication or procedure that is required. Generally, the more severe the illness (from a halakhic perspective) the further into the list the patient's situation is classed. As a patient is classed as more ill there are fewer restrictions and greater leniencies available for treating the illness on the Sabbath. The list of definitions, from least to most severe, is as follows:

  / Mayḥush b'Alma / Minor Indisposition
  / Mikṣat Ḥoli / Semi-illness
  / Ṣa'ar Gadol / Severe Pain (Can in some cases be practically regarded as level 4)
  / Ḥoleh Kol Gufo / Debilitating Illness
  / Sakanat Aiver / Threat to a Limb or Organ (Can in some cases be practically regarded as level 6)
  / Sofek Pikuaḥ Nefesh / Possibly Life-Threatening (Practically treated as level 7)
  / Pikuaḥ Nefesh / Certainly Life-Threatening

For most practical applications the use of medicines on the Sabbath, there are primarily two categories of non-life-threatening (Pikuaḥ Nefesh) illnesses and maladies. They are either Mayḥush b'Alma or Ḥoleh Kol Gufo. In many or most practical applications for non-trained personnel, there are practically only three category levels (1, 4, & 7) as the line of distinction between them can often be difficult to ascertain for the untrained and it may prove dangerous to underestimate the condition.

See further: Mishneh Torah Shabbat 8:15, 21:18–31; Shulkhan Arukh Orach Chayim 321; Chayei Adam Shabbos 17

Sifting
Hebrew:  (Meraked)

Definition: Sorting desirable from undesirable by means of a utensil (designed for sifting or sorting).

This is essentially the same as sorting/purification (see above) but performed with a utensil specifically designed for the purpose of sorting, such as a sieve, strainer, or the like. As such, sorting/purifying with such a device, such as the netting of a tea bag, would be classed as an act of sifting. 

For instance, using a cafetière coffee maker would involve Meraked. As one pushes the plunger down, to sift out the unwanted coffee grinds, a purification of the coffee solution is taking place. The undesirable grinds are removed leaving clear coffee solution that can be decanted to another vessel, e.g., a cup or mug. This act is identical to that the act of Borer but done with a tool or utensil specifically designed for purpose. This classes this act as one of Meraked, not Borer.

See further: Mishneh Torah Shabbat 8:14, 21:32; Shulkhan Arukh Orach Chayim 321, 324; Chayei Adam Shabbos 18

Kneading/amalgamation
Hebrew:  (Losh)

Definition: Combining particles into a semi-solid or solid mass via liquid.

The accepted description of this category, translated to "kneading", is inaccurate. More precisely, the prohibited activity is amalgamation or combining solid and liquid together to form a paste or dough-like substance.

There are four categories of produced substances:
 Blilah Avah (a thick, dense mixture)
 Blilah Raḥa (a thinner, pourable mixture)
 Davar Nozel (a pourable liquid with a similar viscosity to water)
 Ḥatiḥot Gedolot (large pieces mixed with a liquid)

Only producing a Blilah Avah is biblically forbidden.  A Blilah Raḥa mixture is rabbinically forbidden but may be produced by using a shinui (unusual mode), such as the reversing the adding of the ingredients or mixing in crisscross rather than circular motions. As Davar Nozel and Ḥatiḥot Gedolot are not really mixtures, even after adding the liquid to the solid, making them is permitted even without a shinui.

See further: Mishneh Torah Shabbat 8:16, 21:33–36; Shulkhan Arukh Orach Chayim 321,324; Chayei Adam Shabbos 19

Cooking/baking
Hebrew:  (Bishul/Ofeh)

Definition for solids: Desirably changing the properties of something via heat.

Definition for liquids: Bringing a liquid's temperature to the heat threshold. This threshold is known as yad soledet (lit. "A hand reflexively recoils [due to such heat]").

(Note, however, that cooking/baking is permitted on Jewish holidays.  It is an exception to the rule that activities prohibited on the Sabbath are likewise prohibited on holidays.)

Any method of heating food to prepare for eating is included in this prohibition. This is different from "preparing".  For example, a salad can be made because the form of the vegetables does not change, only the size.  However, the vegetables may not be cooked to soften them for eating. Baking was performed in the Mishkan as showbreads were continually required. However, they were not required for the structure. Some opine baking is listed regarding the preparation of the dyes used for the tapestries.

This law is by no means restricted to foods. Firing a brick in a kiln or tempering a piece of metal in a furnace would also be included in desirably changing the properties of an item via heat. However, destroying an item, for no constructive purpose, via heat would not be scripturally prohibited.

See further: Mishneh Torah Shabbat 22:1–10; Shulkhan Arukh Orach Chayim 318; Chayei Adam Shabbos 22

The Order of Garments

Shearing
Hebrew:  (Gozez)

Definition: Severing/uprooting any body-part of a creature.

Shearing a sheep, having a haircut, plucking one's eyebrows or paring one's nails would fall into this category. 

This law is analogous Kotzer. Kotzer is the same activity but performed on a vegetative item still attached to its source of growth.  

See further: Mishneh Torah Shabbat 9:179, 22:13–14; Chayei Adam Shabbos 21

Scouring/laundering
Hebrew: מלבן (Melaben)

Definition: Cleansing absorbent materials of absorbed/ingrained impurities.

See further: Mishneh Torah Shabbat 9:10–11 22:15–20; Shulkhan Arukh Orach Chayim 301–302; Chayei Adam Shabbos 22

Carding/combing wool
Hebrew:  (Menapeitṣ)

Definition: Separating/disentangling fibers.

See further: Mishneh Torah Shabbat 9:12; Chayei Adam Shabbos 23

Dyeing
Hebrew:  (Tzovei'a)

Definition: Coloring/enriching the color of any material or substance.

Merely enriching a color already present, such as applying clear gloss to wood or a fingernail, thus enriching is colour/appearance, would transgress the scriptural law. (This may also present issues of fine-tuning/perfecting, as well).

There may be an exemption for foods as they are not considered permanent. However, aesthetically coloring foods for decoration, such as in a sugar sculpture, is included.

See further: Mishneh Torah Shabbat 9:13–14, 22:23; Shulkhan Arukh Orach Chayim 320; Chayei Adam Shabbos 24

Spinning
Hebrew:  (Toveh)

Definition: Twisting fibers into a thread or twining strands into a yarn.

See further: Mishneh Torah Shabbat 9; Chayei Adam Shabbos 25

Warping
Hebrew:  (Maysach)

Definition: Creating the first form for the purpose of weaving.

See further: Chayei Adam Shabbos 25

Making two loops/threading heddles
Hebrew:  (Oseh Sh'tei Batei Nirin)

Definition: Forming loops for the purpose of weaving. This is also the threading of two heddles on a loom to allow a shed for the shuttle to pass through. According to the Rambam, however, it is the making of net-like materials.

See further: Chayei Adam Shabbos 25

Weaving
Hebrew:  (Oreg)

Definition: Forming fabric (or a fabric item) by interlacing long threads passing in one direction with others at a right angle to them.

See further: Chayei Adam Shabbos 25

Separating two threads
Hebrew: פוצע שני חוטין (Potze'ah)

Definition: Removing/cutting fibers from their frame, loom or place.

See further: Chayei Adam Shabbos 25

Tying
Hebrew:  (Koysher)

Definition: Binding two pliant objects skillfully or permanently via twisting.

See further: Mishneh Torah Shabbat 10:1–6; Chayei Adam Shabbos 26

Untying
Hebrew:  (Matir)

Definition: The undoing of any tied (see Tying) or joined (see Tofer) binding.

See further: Mishneh Torah Shabbat 10:1–6; Chayei Adam Shabbos 27

Sewing
Hebrew:  (Tofer)

Definition: Combining separate objects into a single entity, whether through sewing, gluing, stapling, welding, dry mounting, etc..

See further: Mishneh Torah Shabbat 10:9, 11; Shulkhan Arukh Orach Chayim 340; Chayei Adam Shabbos 28

Tearing
Hebrew:  (Kore'a)

Definition: Ripping an object in two or undoing any sewn (see Sewing) connection.

See further: Mishneh Torah Shabbat 10:10; Shulkhan Arukh Orach Chayim 340; Chayei Adam Shabbos 29, Shabbos 7

The Order of Hides

Trapping
Hebrew:  (Ṣod)

Definition: Forcible confinement of a living creature.

The Mishna does not just write "trapping"; rather, the Mishna says "trapping deer". According to at least one interpretation,  this teaches that to violate the Torah's prohibition of Trapping, two conditions must be met:
 The trapped animal must be non-domesticated.
 The animal must not be legally confined. For example, closing one's front door, thereby confining insects in one's house is not considered trapping as no difference to the insect's 'trappable' status has occurred. I.e. it was as easy or difficult to trap it now as when the door was open.

This creates practical questions such as: "May a fly be trapped under a cup on Shabbat?" The Meno Netziv says that an animal that is not normally trapped (e.g. a fly, or a lizard) is not covered under the Torah prohibition of trapping. It is however, a rabbinic prohibition to do so, therefore one is not allowed to trap the animal. However, if one is afraid of the animal because of its venomous nature or that it might have rabies, one may trap it. If life or limb is threatened, it may be trapped and even killed if absolutely necessary.

Animals which are considered too slow-moving to be 'free' are not included in this category, as trapping them does not change their legal status of being able to grab them in 'one hand swoop' (a term used by the Rambam to define this law). A snail, tortoise, etc. may therefore be confined as they can be grabbed just as easily whether they are in an enclosure or unhindered in the wild. For these purposes trapping them serves no change to their legal status regarding their 'ease of capture,' and they are termed legally pre-trapped due to their nature. Trapping is therefore seen not as a 'removal of liberty,' which caging even such a slow moving creature would be, but rather the confining of a creature to make it easier to capture in one's hand.

Laying traps violates a rabbinic prohibition regardless of what the trap is, as this is a normal method of trapping a creature.

See further: Mishneh Torah Shabbat 10:15; Shulkhan Arukh Orach Chayim 317; Chayei Adam Shabbos 30

Killing
Hebrew:  (Shoḥet)

Definition: Ending a creature's life, whether through slaughter or any other method.

See further: Mishneh Torah Shabbat 11:1–4; Shulkhan Arukh Orach Chayim 316; Chayei Adam Shabbos 31

Flaying/skinning
Hebrew:  (Maphshit)

Definition: Removing the hide from the body of a dead animal.

(Removing skin from a live creature would fall under shearing.)

See further: Mishneh Torah Shabbat 11:5–6, 22:1–10; Shulkhan Arukh Orach Chayim 321, 327; Chayei Adam Shabbos 32

Curing/preservation
Hebrew:  (Me'abaid); sometimes referred to as "Salting"  (Mole'aḥ)

Definition: Preserving any item to prevent spoiling for a long period of time.

The list of activities in the Mishna includes salting hides and curing as separate categories of activity; the Gemara (Tractate Shabbat 75b) amends this to consider them the same activity and to include "tracing lines", also involved in the production of leather, as the thirty-ninth category of activity.

This activity extends rabbinically to salting/pickling foods for non-immediate use on the Sabbath.

See further: Chayei Adam Shabbos 32–33, Shulkhan Arukh Orach Chayim 321, 327; Chayei Adam Shabbos 33

Smoothing
Hebrew:  (Memaḥek)

Definition: Scraping/sanding a surface to achieve smoothness.

This law contains a sub-law (known as a Tolda) called ממרח Memarayach which prohibits the smearing or smoothing of an already pliable substance.

See further: Chayei Adam Shabbos 34–35

Scoring
Hebrew:  (Mesartait)

Definition: Scoring/drawing a cutting guideline.

See further: Jerusalem Talmud, Tractate Shabbat, Chapter "Klall Gadol", p. 52. tirone

Measured cutting
Hebrew:  (Meḥatekh)

Definition: Cutting any object to a specific size.

See further: Mishneh Torah Shabbat 11:7; Chayei Adam Shabbos 36

The Order of Construction

Writing
Hebrew:  (Kotev)

Definition: Writing/forming a meaningful character or design.

Rabbinically, even writing with one's weaker hand is forbidden. The rabbis also forbade any commercial activities, which often lead to writing.

See further: Mishneh Torah Shabbat 11:9–17, 23:12–19; Shulkhan Arukh Orach Chayim 340; Chayei Adam Shabbos 36

Erasing
Hebrew:  (Moḥek [al menat lichtov shtei otiyot])

Definition: Cleaning/preparing a surface to render it suitable for writing.

Erasing in order to write two or more letters is an example of erasing.

See further: Mishneh Torah Shabbat 11:17; Chayei Adam Shabbos 38

Construction
Hebrew:  (Boneh)

Definition: Contributing to the forming of any permanent structure.

See further: Mishneh Torah Shabbat 10:12–14 22:25–33; Chayei Adam Shabbos 39–44

Construction can take two forms. First, there was the action of joining the different pieces together, just like in the making of the make the Mishkan. E.g., inserting the handle of an axe into the socket is a derived form of this activity. Another type is to add to an already existing structure called Mosif Al HaBinyan. As such, putting a nail into a wall in order to serve a useful purpose such as hanging a picture, would be adding the nail to the already existing wall structure.

Making a protective covering (or a tent) is forbidden, as is setting up a fixed partition. 

Opening and closing a door is perfectly permitted due to the presence of a hinge. This shows that this is the intended use and falls under a heading of "Derech Tashmisho"/Mode of Use. Opening and closing a collapsible stroller is permitted due to this concept. However, placing a plank or board into a doorway, or gap in a wall to serve as a door is forbidden. This would be an act of construction of plugging the gap in the wall.

Demolition
Hebrew:  (Soter)

Definition: Demolishing for any constructive purpose.

For example, knocking down a wall in order to extend or repair the wall would be demolition for a constructive purpose. Combing a wig to set it correctly and pulling out hairs during the procedure with a metal toothed brush or comb would be constructive 'demolition', as each hair that is removed in the process of the wig (a utensil) is progressing its state towards a desired completion. Each hair's removal partially demolishes the wig (for these legal purposes) and is considered constructive when viewed in context of the desired goal.

See further: Mishneh Torah Shabbat 10:15; Chayei Adam Shabbos 39, 43

Extinguishing a fire
Hebrew:  (Mekhabeh)

Definition: Extinguishing a fire/flame, or diminishing its intensity.

While extinguishing a fire is forbidden even when great property damage will result, in the event of any life-threatening fire, the flames must be extinguished, by the principle of pikuaḥ nefesh.

See further: Shulkhan Arukh Orach Chayim 334; Chayei Adam Shabbos 45

Ignition
Hebrew:  (Mav'ir)

Definition: Igniting, fueling or spreading a fire/flame.

This includes making, transferring or adding fuel to a fire. (Note, however, that transferring fire is permitted on Jewish holidays.  It is an exception to the rule that activities prohibited on the Sabbath are likewise prohibited on holidays.) This is one of the few Sabbath prohibitions mentioned explicitly in the Torah.

Judaism requires Sabbath candles to be lit before the Sabbath; it is forbidden to light them on the Sabbath.

Ignition is one of the Sabbath laws that has been cited to prohibit electricity on Shabbat.

See further: Mishneh Torah Shabbat 12:1; Chayei Adam Shabbos 46

Final Completion/Fine-tuning/Perfection
Hebrew:  (Makeh B'patish), literally, striking with a hammer.

Definition: Any initial act of completion.

This complex, and possibly most abstract section of Sabbath law, refers to activities completing an object and/or bringing it into its final useful form.

For example, if the pages of a newspaper were poorly separated, slicing them open would constitute the final act of completion of the pages.

Using a stapler involves transgressing final completion/fine-tuning/perfection in regard to the staple itself, (in addition to sewing affecting the papers being joined), which is brought into its final useful form by the base of the stapler forming the open staple into a curled clasp around the papers.

Adding hot water to a pre-made 'noodle-soup-pot' type cup (a dehydrated mixture of freeze-dried seasoning and noodles) would be the final act of completion for such a food as the manufacturer desired to make the product incomplete, awaiting the consumer to finish the cooking process at their convenience. This particular example would also violate Cooking/Baking as well if hot water from a kettle/urn was directly applied.

Musical instruments are Muktza, set aside for non-Sabbath use, as they are delicate and regularly require fixing and/or tuning as part of their regular use. Due to this, a Rabbinic restriction on handling musical instruments was enacted specifically because of Makeh B'patish. For example, if a guitar string is slightly out of tune, even though the whole instrument is not considered broken, the string requires tuning to bring the entire instrument to its desired state. As such, the corrective tuning renders an act of Makeh B'patish on the whole instrument. The guitar's said to be 'in tune', ready for usual use. This is considered a significant enough improvement to be an act of Makeh B'patish.

See further: Mishneh Torah Shabbat 10:16–18, 23:4–9; Chayei Adam Shabbos 44

Transferring between domains

Hebrew:  (Hotza'ah)

Definition: Transferring something from one domain type to another domain type, or transferring within a public thoroughfare.

(Note, however, that Transferring between domains types is permitted on Jewish holidays.  It is an exception to the rule that activities prohibited on the Sabbath are likewise prohibited on holidays.)

All areas are divided into four categories: a private domain, a public thoroughfare, an open area (carmelit) and an exempt area. Transferring an object from a private domain to a public thoroughfare, and vice versa, is biblically forbidden. Transferring an object between an open area to a private domain or public thoroughfare is rabbinically prohibited. Transferring an object between an exempt area and any other domain is permissible. In addition, transferring an object for a distance of four cubits (or more) in a public thoroughfare or open area is forbidden.

For these purposes "transferring" means "removing and depositing". So carrying an article out of one domain type and returning to the same domain type, without setting it down in the interim in a different domain type, does not violate this activity. However, it is rabbinically prohibited.

The definition of an area as public thoroughfare or private domain is related to its degree of enclosure, not solely based on ownership.

This law is often referred to as carrying. This is a misnomer: carrying within a private domain is permitted; and carrying within an open area is biblically permitted (though rabbinically forbidden).

See further: Chayei Adam Shabbos 47–56.

Exception: Saving of human life

When human life is endangered, a Jew is not only allowed, but required, to violate any Sabbath law that stands in the way of saving that person. The concept of life being in danger is interpreted broadly; for example, it is mandated that one violate the Sabbath to take a woman in active labor to a hospital.

See also
 Biblical mile
 Driving during Shabbat
 Electricity on Shabbat
 Muktzeh
 Shabbos goy

Notes

References

External links
 Detailed descriptions of the 39 melakhot
 The Principles of the Melakhot in Peninei Halakha by Rabbi Eliezer Melamed

Laws of Shabbat
Negative Mitzvoth